"Desert Rose" is a song by British musician Sting featuring Cheb Mami from his album Brand New Day (1999). According to Sting, the lyrics have to do with "lost love and longing". Riding a wave of pre-9/11 interest in Latin and Arabic cultures, the song peaked at  2 in Canada, No. 3 in Switzerland, No. 4 in Italy, No. 15 in the UK, and No. 17 in the US. The song is noted for Sting's duet performance with Algerian raï singer Mami.

Reception
The song's album Brand New Day received moderate to positive reviews, with some reviewers stating that it had a "world-beat", or sounded "exotic". However, in the reviews "Desert Rose" was cited as being different than the rest of the album, being one of the highlights of the album. The critics take on Sting's "world music" did not sit well with the singer, stating that he did not do world music, though acknowledging the North African feel to the song.

Music video
The music video was directed by Paul Boyd, and features Sting taking a trip through the Mojave Desert in a Jaguar S-Type driven by a masked female chauffeur while recording himself on a JVC GR-DVX4 video camera, and then going to a nightclub in Las Vegas to perform the song with Cheb Mami. Scenes also feature Sting walking alone in the desert holding the camera up. It ends with a shot of Sting with his eyes shut (possibly asleep) in the back seat of the Jaguar, which is then seen driving off into the distance. After shooting the video, Sting's manager Miles Copeland III approached a music licensing maven, Lloyd Simon, to work with Jaguar on a collaboration, and the auto company featured the video in their prominent television advertisements during the year 2000.

Remixes
Also included on the single releases were club remixes by Victor Calderone. One remixed version of the song was used in an alternative edit of the video, which included more sexually explicit footage. The song was later re-released on Sting's later album Duets.

Track listings
UK CD1 
 "Desert Rose (radio edit)" – 3:55
 "If You Love Somebody Set Them Free" (live at the Universal Amphitheatre, Los Angeles) – 4:27
 "Fragile" (live at the Universal Amphitheatre, Los Angeles) – 4:10
 "Desert Rose" video (CD-ROM)

UK CD2 
 "Desert Rose (Melodic Club Mix radio edit)" – 4:47
 "Desert Rose (Melodic Club Mix)" – 9:21
 "Desert Rose (Filter Dub Mix)" – 5:21
 "Desert Rose (Melodic Club Mix)" video (CD-ROM)

UK 12-inch 
 "Desert Rose (Melodic Club Mix)"
 "Desert Rose (Filter Dub Mix)"
 "Desert Rose" (original)

US CD 
 "Desert Rose (radio edit)" – 3:54
 "Desert Rose (Melodic Club Mix radio edit)" – 4:44
 "Brand New Day (Murlyn Extended Mix)" – 5:01
 "Brand New Day (Murlyn Radio Mix)" – 3:54

Europe CD 
 "Desert Rose (radio edit)" – 3:54
 "Desert Rose (Melodic Club Mix)" – 9:20
 "Desert Rose (Melodic Club Mix radio edit)" – 4:44
 "Brand New Day (Murlyn Mix)" – 5:01
 "Brand New Day" video (CD-ROM)

Personnel 

 Sting – lead vocals, backing vocals, bass guitar, Roland VG-8 guitar synthesizer
 Kipper – keyboards, drum programming
 Dominic Miller – guitars
 David Hartley – Hammond organ
 Manu Katché – drums
 Farhat Bouallagui – string arrangements, conductor and leader
 Isobel Griffiths – orchestral contractor
 Moulay Ahmed, Kouider Berkan, Salem Bnouni, Sameh Catalan  – strings
 Cheb Mami – vocals

Charts

Weekly charts

Year-end charts

Release history

References

External links
 

1999 songs
2000 singles
A&M Records singles
Macaronic songs
Music videos directed by Paul Boyd
Number-one singles in Greece
Number-one singles in Portugal
Songs written by Sting (musician)
Sting (musician) songs
Male vocal duets
Jaguar Cars